The Torrey Lake Petroglyph District extends for about  along Torrey Creek in Fremont County, Wyoming. The site includes about 175 petroglyphs, as well as eleven lithic scatters and a sheep trap. The petroglyphs are in the Interior Line Style, or Dinwoody style, consistent with other rock art in central Wyoming. Site investigations have uncovered a number of petroglyphs that had previously been hidden under lichen. The site was placed on the National Register of Historic Places on October 4, 1993.

References

External links
 Torrey Lake Petroglyph District at the Wyoming State Historic Preservation Office
 Torrey Valley Petroglyph Recording Project at the American Rock Art Research Association

National Register of Historic Places in Fremont County, Wyoming
Shoshone National Forest
Archaeological sites on the National Register of Historic Places in Wyoming